The 2002–03 season was the 81st season in the existence of Deportivo Alavés, and the club's fifth season in the top flight of Spanish football since winning promotion from the 1997–98 Segunda División. In addition to the domestic league, Alavés participated in this season's editions of the Copa del Rey and UEFA Cup. The season covered the period from 1 July 2002 to 30 June 2003.

First-team squad
Retrieved on 14 May 2021

Left club during season
Retrieved on 14 May 2021

Out on loan for the full season
Retrieved on 10 May 2021

Transfers

In

Out

Competitions

Overview

La Liga

League table

Results summary

Results by round

Matches

Copa del Rey

UEFA Cup

First round

Deportivo Alavés won 5–1 on aggregate

Second round

Beşiktaş won 2–1 on aggregate

Statistics

Appearances and goals
Last updated on 15 May 2021.

|-
|colspan="12"|Players who have left the club after the start of the season:

|}

Goal scorers

References

Deportivo Alavés seasons
Deportivo Alavés